RGT or Rgt has several uses including:

 Rgt. a common abbreviation for regiment
 Ruf RGT a German car
 Group RGT, a rallying category
 RGT, National Rail station code for Rugeley Town railway station, Staffordshire, England